Nadi Theke Sagare (Bengali: নদী থেকে সাগরে) is a 1978 Bengali feature film directed by Arabinda Mukhopadhyay. The film was written by Prasanta Chowdhury. The screenplay was written by Sunil Gangopadhyay and Arabinda Mukhopadhyay. It stars Soumitra Chatterjee, Sandhya Roy, Debashree Roy, Mithun Chakraborty, Chhaya Devi, Rabi Ghosh and Anup Kumar. Debashree Roy was credited as Rumki Roy in the film. The music of the film was composed by Hemanta Mukherjee with lyrics penned by Pulak Bandyopadhyay and Arabinda Mukhopadhyay.

As described by the director, the character played by Mithun Chakraborty undergoes a journey of his life. This is the film where Debashree Roy, for the first time played a leading role. She played the unfathered daughter to the character played by Sandhya Roy and had to enact the adolescence as well as the adulthood of the character she was given. She drew critical favour for her gaze in the film. Soumitra Chatterjee and Ajitesh Banerjee won critical favour for their performance in the film. The film was a major success at box office.

Cast
Soumitra Chatterjee
Sandhya Roy
Debashree Roy
Mithun Chakraborty
Chhaya Devi
Ajitesh Bandopadhyay	
Rabi Ghosh
Anup Kumar
Mrinal Mukherjee
Ajit Chatterjee
Shamita Biswas
Gita Dey
Sulata Chowdhury

References

External links
 

1978 films
Bengali-language Indian films
1970s Bengali-language films
Films based on works by Sunil Gangopadhyay